Cocked & Re-Loaded is a re-recording of L.A. Guns' 1989 album Cocked & Loaded. It also includes a remix of "Rip and Tear". This album also has at least three different album covers.

Like their previous studio album, Greatest Hits and Black Beauties, this album consists of re-recorded, old material. Their 7th studio album Man in the Moon is all new material, after the band had stopped releasing albums of new versions of older songs.

Track listing
 "Letting Go"
 "Slap In the Face"
 "Rip and Tear"
 "Sleazy Come Easy Go"
 "Never Enough"
 "Malaria"
 "The Ballad of Jayne"
 "Magdalaine"
 "Give a Little"
 "I'm Addicted"
 "17 Crash"
 "Showdown (Riot On Sunset)"
 "Wheels of Fire"
 "I Wanna Be Your Man"
 "Rip and Tear" (Spahn Ranch Remix)

Personnel
 Phil Lewis – Lead Vocals
 Tracii Guns – Guitar
 Mick Cripps – Guitar, Keyboards
 Kelly Nickels – Bass, Vocals
 Steve Riley – Drums, Backing Vocals

References

2000 albums
L.A. Guns albums